Donna Oberlander is an American politician. A member of the Republican Party, she was elected to her first term in the Pennsylvania House of Representatives in November 2008. She serves as the majority whip, and has been appointed to the Rules Committee and the Committee on Committees.

Career
Before she was elected to the House, Oberlander served as legislative aide to former State Representative Fred McIlhattan. She left that office to help local businesses grow and expand in Clarion County before being elected to the Clarion County Board of Commissioners in 2004.

Committee assignments 

 Committee On Committees
 Rules

Personal
Oberlander graduated from Clarion University with a bachelor's degree in political science. Upon graduation, she married her high school sweetheart, a United States Marine stationed in Quantico, Virginia. While in Quantico, Oberlander worked for a government contractor tracking radio communications for Navy ships. She has two children.

References

External links
Representative Donna Oberlander's Official Web Site
PA House Profile

Living people
American people of German descent
Republican Party members of the Pennsylvania House of Representatives
Women state legislators in Pennsylvania
21st-century American politicians
21st-century American women politicians
1970 births